Petre Coman (born 8 June 1944) is a Romanian former wrestler who competed in the 1968 Summer Olympics, in the 1972 Summer Olympics, and in the 1976 Summer Olympics.

References

1944 births
Living people
Olympic wrestlers of Romania
Wrestlers at the 1968 Summer Olympics
Wrestlers at the 1972 Summer Olympics
Wrestlers at the 1976 Summer Olympics
Romanian male sport wrestlers

de:Ion Păun